B0, that is "B subscript zero", is also generally used in Magnetic Resonance Imaging to denote the net magnetization vector. Although in physics and mathematics the notation to represent a physical quantity can be arbitrary, it is generally accepted in the literature, such as the  International Society for Magnetic Resonance in Medicine that B0 represents net magnetization. This is particularly prominent in areas of science where magnetic fields are important such as spectroscopy. By convention, B0 is interpreted as a vector quantity pointing the z-direction, with subsequent x and y cartesian axes oriented with the right hand rule.

B0 is also the symbol often used to denote the reference magnetization in which equations with electromagnetic fields are normalized.

References 

Magnetic resonance imaging